Patrick or Pat Lawlor may refer to:

Patrick Lawlor (politician) (1923–1993), Canadian provincial politician
Pat Lawlor (hurler) (born 1948), Irish hurler
Pat Lawlor (born 1951), American game designer
Pat  Lawlor (writer) (1893–1979), New Zealand writer

See also
Patrick Lawler (disambiguation)